The Jack F. Paulus Skiway  is an airport located at Amundsen–Scott South Pole Station at the South Pole.

The station has a runway for aircraft, 3658 m / 12000 ft long. Between October and February, there are several flights per week of ski-equipped LC-130 Hercules aircraft from McMurdo Station to supply the station.  Additionally, Kenn Borek Air Twin Otters and DC-3s visit the base in support of science and logistics. Resupply missions are collectively termed Operation Deep Freeze.

Dimensional cargo capacity of the Hercules aircraft must be considered for all of the station's logistical support.  Large scientific experiments and structures such as the new station are broken down into modular pieces and reassembled on-site.  Limitations and cost of the Hercules aircraft have been cited by the National Science Foundation as one of the main reasons for the McMurdo–South Pole traverse over-ice ground supply route.

Etymology
Jack F. Paulus was a pilot who had nine deployments in Antarctica between 1969 and 1981.

See also
 List of airports in Antarctica

References

External links
Current weather for NZSP

Airports in Antarctica
Skiway